Sir Christopher Rupert Walford (15 October 1935 – 21 October 2015) was an English solicitor who served as the 667th Lord Mayor of London.

Biography
Walford was born in London; his father was a barrister who worked as a legal assistant in the Ministry of Pensions. When the Ministry was evacuated to Blackpool in 1940, the family moved with it, returning to Kensington in 1949.

Walford's civic life began in 1962 when he became a councillor for the Royal Borough of Kensington. In 1964 Kensington and Chelsea became one Borough but he continued as a councillor becoming Deputy Mayor in 1974 and Mayor in 1979 of the now Royal Borough of Kensington and Chelsea.

In 1982 he turned his thoughts to the City of London and was elected Alderman for the Ward of Farringdon Within.  He was a Liveryman of the Worshipful Company of Makers of Playing Cards becoming Master in 1987. In 1993 he was Master of the City of London Solicitors’ Company.

He was elected as the Aldermanic Sheriff in 1990. In 1994 he was elected Lord Mayor.

He was knighted on 17 June 1995

Job positions
City and Corporation
Freeman of the City of London 1964
Elected Alderman for the Ward of Farringdon Within 1982
Sheriff of the City of London 1990/91
Master of the Worshipful Company of Makers of Playing Cards 1987/88
Master of the City of London Solicitors Company 1993/94
Honorary Court Member Builders Merchants’ Company 1990
Member of the Guild of Freemen of the City of London
Lieutenancy
One of HM Lieutenants for the City of London
Charities
Trustee of Morden College, Blackheath
Trustee of the St Paul's Cathedral Choir School Foundation
Trustee of the Guildhall School, Music and Drama Foundation
Governor, Bridewell Royal Hospital

References

Sheriffs of the City of London
British solicitors
20th-century lord mayors of London
20th-century English politicians
Knights Bachelor
1935 births
2015 deaths